The Paulinum is a university building of University of Leipzig, whose construction began in 2007. Today's Paulinum stands at the site of the old university church, the Paulinerkirche, which was destroyed in 1968 during the communist regime of East Germany.

The building was designed by award-winning architect Erick van Egeraat. The Paulinum contains the university's assembly hall with an oratory, as well as rooms of the faculties for information science and mathematics. The assembly hall, which was erected on exactly the same site as the old university church, exhibits figures and other objects from Paulinerkirche and offers a room of common prayer. The University of Leipzig is one of the few German universities which retains the tradition of having its own university chapel, a tradition dating back for over 500 years. The facade of the Paulinum features collegiate gothic architecture as a commemoration of the original building.

The name Paulinum derives from the old Collegium Paulinum (St. Paul's College) which was one of the old colleges at the University of Leipzig, which included the original university church.

The Organ 
Construction of the instrument was by Jehmlich Orgelbau Dresden (opus 1161) and was completed in 2017. The console consists of three manuals and a pedalboard.  The 2951 pipes are in four divisions.

References

Buildings and structures in Leipzig
Leipzig University